Colposcelis elegans is a species of darkling beetles in the subfamily Pimeliinae. It has a palaearctic distribution in Asia.

References

External links 

 Colposcelis elegans at insectoid.info

Beetles described in 1968
Pimeliinae